Mark Alan Henn (born April 6, 1958) is an American animator and film director. His contributions to animation have included several Walt Disney Animation Studios leading or title characters, most notably heroines. His work includes Ariel in The Little Mermaid, Belle in Beauty and the Beast, Jasmine in Aladdin, Young Simba in The Lion King, the title character in Mulan, and Tiana in The Princess and the Frog. Additionally he directed the short film John Henry.

Early life
Henn grew up in Ohio. In 1978, Henn was accepted into the Character Animation program at the California Institute of the Arts, where he studied under Disney animators such as Jack Hannah and T. Hee. Fellow students included Joe Ranft, Mark Dindal and John Lasseter.

Career
Henn joined the Disney studio in 1980 and began work as an inbetweener for Glen Keane on The Fox and the Hound. According to Henn, Keane was finishing the climactic bear fight scene and Henn worked with him on that. Henn has also worked on other animated features such as Mickey's Christmas Carol, The Great Mouse Detective and The Little Mermaid.

Henn has also animated Mickey Mouse on Nighttime Spectaculars in DisneyParks and Resorts, including Celebrate The Magic in Walt Disney World's Magic Kingdom, World of Color – Celebrate! The Wonderful World of Walt Disney  in Disney's California Adventure Park, Ignite the Dream, A Nighttime Spectacular of Magic and Light in Shanghai Disneyland, Disney Illuminations in Disneyland Paris, Disney Gifts Of Christmas and Celebrate! Tokyo Disneyland in Tokyo Disneyland, and "We Love Mickey" Main Street Projection Show in Hong Kong Disneyland.

Awards and honors
Henn has been nominated for an Annie award four times: three times for Character Animation for The Lion King, Mulan, and Winnie the Pooh, and once for Short Animated Film Direction for John Henry. In 2017, Henn was the recipient of the Winsor McCay Award for lifetime achievement in animation.

Filmography

References

Further reading

External links
 

1958 births
Animators from Ohio
Walt Disney Animation Studios people
Living people